The United Arab Emirates consists of seven emirates, which were historically known as the Trucial States. There are no internal barriers hindering movement between the emirates.

See also 
 ISO 3166-2:AE

References 

 
Subdivisions of the United Arab Emirates
United Arab Emirates, Emirates
United Arab Emirates 1
Emirates, United Arab Emirates
United Arab Emirates geography-related lists